Thiona is a monotypic moth genus of the family Erebidae. Its only species, Thiona phalaena, is found in Brazil. Both the genus and species were first described by Achille Guenée in 1852.

References

Calpinae
Monotypic moth genera